Arcadia is one of the regional units of Greece. It is part of the administrative region of Peloponnese. It is in the central and eastern part of the Peloponnese peninsula. It takes its name from the mythological figure Arcas. In Greek mythology, it was the home of the god Pan. In European Renaissance arts, Arcadia was celebrated as an unspoiled, harmonious wilderness.

Geography
Arcadia is a rural, mountainous regional unit comprising about 18% of the land area of the Peloponnese peninsula. It is the peninsula's largest regional unit. According to the 2011 census, it has about 86,000 inhabitants; its capital, Tripoli, has about 30,000 residents in the city proper, and about 47,500 total in the greater metropolitan area.

Arcadia consists partly of farmland, and to a larger extent grassland and degenerated shrubland. It also has three mountain ranges, with forestation mainly at altitudes above 1000 meters: Mainalo, a winter ski resort, situated in the central north; Parnon in the central south; and Mount Lykaion, famous for the ancient history and myths associated with it, in the southwest.

Its climate features hot summers and mild winters in the east, the south, and those parts of the central area that are less than 1000 meters above sea level. Fall and winter are mostly rainy, except in the mountains to the west and north, Taygetus and Mainalo, which are snowy in winter.

Geology and Hydrogeology

Arcadia is almost totally mountainous and part of the "carbonate platform" (calcareous or limestone deposits) of the Peloponnese. The whole peninsula was formed by intense tectonics (faults, overthrusts and regional metamorphism). In Arcadia's central part around the Tripoli region developed a special form of topography, a geologically fascinating phenomenon: There are several plains and "intra mountainous basins", even "closed basins": The 30 km long "Tripoli-Plateau", "Argon Pedion", Basin of Levidi, Basin of Vlacherna Arcadia/Hotoussa/Kandila.<ref>I. Mariolakos (Greek geologist) describes these special geological phenomena of Arcadia and relates them to local ancient myths. See "Literature" and "External Links"</</ref>

The peculiarity of the plains and basins is a result of intensive karstification: Water seeps into the underground, rather than eroding and draining the topography by surface waterways. All drainage runs through ponors (in Greek: καταβόθρες) and subterranean waterways. The additional problem for rural activities in the basins: When winter rains are heavy, the ground is flooded or temporary lakes arise, even today, as drainage through katavothres is often too slow to start cultivation in due time.

History

Ancient history

Medieval history
After the collapse of the Roman Empire in the west, Arcadia remained as part of the Greek-speaking Byzantine Empire. Arcadia remained a beautiful, secluded area, and its inhabitants became proverbial as herdsmen leading simple pastoral unsophisticated yet happy lives, to the point that Arcadia may refer to some imaginary idyllic paradise, immortalized by Virgil's Eclogues, and later by Jacopo Sannazaro in his pastoral masterpiece, Arcadia (1504); see also Arcadia (utopia).

After the Fourth Crusade, the area became a part of the Principality of Achaea, but was progressively recovered by the Byzantine Greeks of the Despotate of the Morea from the 1260s on, a process that was completed in 1320. The region fell into the hands of the Ottoman Turks along with the rest of the Despotate in 1460. With the exception of a period of Venetian rule in 1687–1715, the region remained under Turkish control until 1821.

The Latin phrase Et in Arcadia ego, which is usually interpreted to mean "Even in Arcadia there am I", is an example of memento mori, a cautionary reminder of the transitory nature of life and the inevitability of death. The phrase is most often associated with a 1647 painting by Nicolas Poussin, also known as "The Arcadian Shepherds". In the painting the phrase appears as an inscription on a tomb discovered by youthful figures in classical garb.

Modern history

Arcadia was one of the centres of the Greek War of Independence which saw victories in their battles including one in Tripoli. After a victorious revolutionary war, Arcadia was finally incorporated into the newly created Greek state.  Arcadia saw economic growth and small emigration.

In the 20th century, Arcadia experienced extensive population loss through emigration, mostly to the Americas.  Many Arcadian villages lost half their inhabitants, and fears arose that they would turn into ghost towns.  Arcadia now has a smaller population than Corinthia.  Demographers expected that its population would halve between 1951 and the early 21st century.  The population has fallen to 87,000 in 2011.

An earthquake measuring 5.9 on the Richter magnitude scale shook Megalopoli and the surrounding area in 1965. Large numbers of buildings were destroyed, leaving people homeless. Within a couple of years, the buildings were rebuilt anti-seismically. This earthquake revealed an underground source of lignite in the area, and in 1967 construction began on the Megalopoli Power Plant, which began operating in 1970. The mining area south of the plant is the largest mining area in the peninsula and continues to the present day with one settlement moved.

In July and August 2007 forest fires caused damage in Arcadia, notably in the mountains.

In 2008, a theory proposed by classicist Christos Mergoupis suggested that the mummified remains of Alexander the Great (not his actual tomb), may in fact be located in Gortynia-Arkadia, in the Peloponnese of Greece. Since 2008, this research is ongoing and currently being conducted in Greece. The research was first mentioned on CNN International in May 2008.

Language
When, during the Greek Dark Ages (c. 1200 BC–800 BC), Doric Greek was introduced to the Peloponnese, the older Arcadocypriot Greek language apparently survived in Arcadia. Arcadocypriot never became a literary dialect, but it is known from inscriptions. Tsan is a letter of the Greek alphabet occurring only in Arcadia, shaped like Cyrillic И; it represents an affricate that developed from labiovelars in context where they became t in other dialects.

The Tsakonian language, still spoken on the coast of modern Arcadia (but in the Classical period considered the southern Argolid coast immediately adjoining Arcadia), is a descendant of Doric Greek, and as such is an exceptional example of a surviving regional dialect of archaic Greek. The principal cities of Tsakonia are the Arcadian coastal towns of Leonidio and Tyros.

Administration

The regional unit Arcadia is subdivided into 5 municipalities. These are (number as in the map in the infobox):
Gortynia (3)
Megalopoli (5)
North Kynouria (Voreia Kynouria, 2)
South Kynouria (Notia Kynouria, 4)
Tripoli (1)

Prefecture

As a part of the 2011 Kallikratis government reform, the regional unit Arcadia was created out of the former prefecture Arcadia. The prefecture had the same territory as the present regional unit. At the same time, the municipalities were reorganised, according to the table below.

Provinces
Arcadia was divided into four provinces:
Province of Gortynia—Dimitsana
Province of Kynouria—Leonidio
Province of Mantineia—Tripolis
Province of Megalopoli—Megalopolis
Note: Provinces no longer hold any legal status in Greece.

Ancient and modern towns and cities

The main towns in modern Arcadia are Tripoli, Astros, Vytina, Dimitsana, Lagkadia, Tyros, Leonidio, Levidi, Megalopoli and Stemnitsa.

Ancient cities include Acacesium, Asea, Astros, Athinaio, Daseae, Falaisia (Phalesia), Gortys, Hypsus (Stemnitsa), Heraia, Lusi, Lykaio, Lycosura, Mantineia, Megalopolis, Orchomenus (Orchomenos), Tegea, Thoknia, Trapezus, Trikolonoi, Tropaia, Tripoli, Tyros, other cities includes Basilis, Caphyae, Charisia, Ellison, Enispe, Kaous, Karyes, Methydrio, Melangeia, Oryx, Paroria, Pelagos, Rhipe, Stratia, Teuthis and several more.  Cities which once belonged in Arcadia include Alea (now in Argolis), Amilos (now in Achaia), and Phigalia (now in Elis).

Economy

A thermoelectric power station which produces electricity for most of southern Greece, operates to the south of Megalopolis, along with a coal mine.

In agriculture, potato farms (dominant in central and northcentral Arcadia), mixed farming, olive groves, and pasture dominate the plains of Arcadia, especially in the area around Megalopolis and between Tripoli and Levidi.

Transportation
The Moreas Motorway (A7, E65) highway connects Tripoli with Corinth and Athens. It is being extended further southwest to Megalopoli and Kalamata.

Major roads or highways:
Greek National Road 7
Greek National Road 33, N
Greek National Road 39, Cen, S
Greek National Road 66, N
Greek National Road 74, NW, N
Greek National Road 76, W, SW
Secondary roads:
Leontari-Dyrrachio Road
Astros-Tyros-Leonidi-Monemvasia Road
Karytaina-Dimitsana Road
Megalopoli-Lykaio Road
Sparta-Leonidi Road
Tripoli-Dimitsana Road
Tripoli-Astros-Tyros-Leonidi Road
Tripoli-Nestani Road
Tripoli-Vytina Road
Veligosti-Vastas Road
Vourvoura-Leonidi Road

Arcadia has two tunnels. The Artemisio Tunnel opened first, followed by the tunnel east of Megalopolis; both serve traffic flowing between Messenia and Athens.

News
 Arcadia Portal | The news site of Arcadia
 tyrostsakonia.gr
 leonidion.gr

Television
Arkadiki Radiofonia Tileorasi – ART

Sports teams
Asteras Tripolis is the Greek soccer club from the city of Tripoli.
Arkadikos B.C. is the basketball team based in Tripoli, founded in 1976.

Notable Arcadians

Mythology
 Lycaon, a mythical King of Arcadia
 Hermes, God of the gymnasium, public speaking, thievery, heralds and travellers.
 Pan, God of the wild, shepherds and flocks, nature of mountain wilds, hunting and rustic music, and companion of the nymphs
Atalanta, a Greek mythic woman said to have been the daughter of the King of Arcadia

Ancient Arcadians
Polybius (app. 200–118 BC), Greek historian of the Hellenistic Period (Megalopolis)
Philopoemen (253–183 BC), Greek general and statesman, Achaean strategos, known as "the last of the Greeks"

Ancient Olympic victors
Androsthenes of Maenalus, won in 420 and 416 BC
Euthymenes of Maenalus (wrestler), won in 400 and 392 BC

Greek War of Independence fighters
Theodoros Kolokotronis (1770–1843), Field Marshal in the Greek War of Independence (1821–1832), he was raised and lived in Arcadia (Libovisi).
Nikitas Stamatelopoulos Nikitaras o Tourkofagos (Nikitaras the Turk-Eater) (1784–1849), Greek revolutionary, nephew of Theodoros Kolokotronis (Tourkoleka)
Dimitris Plapoutas (1786–1864), general in the Greek War of Independence (Paloumba)
Gennaios Kolokotronis (1803–1868), Greek revolutionary, Major General and Prime Minister of Greece (May 1862 – October 1862), son of Theodoros Kolokotronis (Stemnitsa)
Kanellos Deligiannis (1780–1862), Greek revolutionary leader, politician and President of the Hellenic Parliament (1844–1845) (Lagkadia)

Politicians
Alexandros Papanastasiou (1876–1936), Prime Minister of Greece (March 1924 – July 1924 and May 1932 – June 1932) and sociologist (Levidi)
Epameinondas Deligiorgis (1829–1879), Prime Minister of Greece, lawyer (Tripoli)
Grigoris Labrakis (1912–1963), politician, doctor (Kerasitsa) 
Theodoros Deligiannis (1820–1905), Prime Minister of Greece (Lagkadia)
Dimitrios Gontikas (1888–1967), politician and President of the Hellenic Parliament (Magouliana)
Kostas Laliotis (1951–), Minister for the Environment, Physical Planning and Public Works (1993–2001) (Doliana)
Dimitris Avramopoulos (1953–), Minister for Foreign Affairs (2012–), Minister of National Defence (2011–2012), Mayor of Athens (1995–2002) (Elliniko)

Poets
Nikos Gatsos (1911–1992), (Asea)
Kostas Karyotakis (1896–1928), (Tripoli)

Scientists, scholars, educators, academicians
Georgios Mistriotis (1840–1916), philologist, Professor of the University of Athens (Tripoli)
Konstantinos Romaios (1874–1966), archaeologist, President of the Academy of Athens (Vourvoura)

Artists
Mimis Fotopoulos (1913–1986), actor (Zatouna) 
Costas Gavras (1933–), director (Loutra Iraias)
Maria Menounos (1978–), actress, television presenter, journalist (Akovo) 
Dimitris Mitropoulos, conductor and composer (Melissopetra)
Vasilis Papakonstantinou (1950–), singer and director (Vasta)
Kostas Tournas (1949–), singer and composer (Tripoli)
Kostas Triantafyllopoulos (1956–), actor (Athinaio)
Babis Tsertos (1956–), musician, singer (Tropaia)
Stavros Tsiolis (1937–), director (Tripoli)
Electros Vekris, artist / sculptor

Athletes
Dimitris Kourbelis (1993–), international footballer (Korakovouni)
Yiannis Kouros (1956–), ultramarathon runner (Tripoli)
Michail Mouroutsos (1980–), Olympic taekwondo gold medalist (Lagkadia)

Other notable personalities
 Erasmus of Arcadia, Greek Orthodox bishop
 Lakis Santas (1922–2011), Greek Resistance fighter who climbed on the Acropolis (with Manolis Glezos), on May 30, 1941, and tore down the swastika, which had been there since April 27, 1941, when the Nazi forces had entered Athens (Vytina)

In popular culture

 The word Arcadia has become a poetic idyllism meaning "utopia".
 Sir Philip Sidney (1554–1586) wrote The Countess of Pembroke's Arcadia, a combination of pastoral romance and poetry, for his sister, Mary Sidney. It was hugely popular for over a century. 
 In the science fiction show Doctor Who, Arcadia is the second city on The Doctor's home planet of Gallifrey 
 Arcadia is the name of a prize-winning play by Tom Stoppard (1993).
 The Greek and Latin name Arcadius (Arkadios) was derived from "Arcadia" (see the Emperor Arcadius, the grammarian Arcadius of Antioch, the patriarch Arkadios II). From Greek it passed in Russian, Ukrainian, and other Slavic languages, where it is a common male name as Arkady or Arcady.
 The area of the prefecture were featured in several ERT programs including documentaries on the Megalopoli Mine and Ladon Lake.
 Marianas Trench refers to Arcadia, in their 2009–2010 song "Acadia", referring to it as a "unspoiled, harmonious wilderness".
 The rescue boat from Resident Evil 4 - Afterlife that appears near the end of the movie is named "Arcadia" and broadcasts a recorded help message that the survivors in Los Angeles will receive. Reaching the Arcadia will become their main objective in order to avoid being attacked by more zombies.
 The 2014 TV series Resurrection takes place in a real town, Arcadia, Missouri. The choice of setting likely is a reference to the Latin phrase Et in Arcadia ego, since the premise of the show deals with questions of life, death, and people being resurrected from the dead.
 The Greek musician Demis Roussos released a song in 1978 titled "Lovely Lady of Arcadia".
 The video game BioShock features a level and setting named Arcadia, which is a reference to the geography and landscape similarities.
 The video game Life Is Strange takes place in the fictional Oregon town of Arcadia Bay.
On 9 August 2017 BBC 4 broadcast In search of Arcadia a television documentary featured a  section of the River Thames.
 Tales of Arcadia is an animated trilogy series created by Guillermo del Toro
 Arkadia is one of the regions of Greece that can be conquered/defended by either Athens or Sparta in the 2018 video game Assassin's Creed Odyssey. The region is considered a principal Greek breadbasket during the ongoing Peloponnesian War.
 Arcadia is the name of the space battleship of Captain Harlock.

See also
 Polje

References

General and cited references 
 COST 621, Final Report, Groundwater Management of coastal karst aquifers, Brussels 2005.
 Ford, D. C. and Williams, P., Karst Hydrogeology and Geomorphology, Chichester, 2007, 4th, rev. ed.
 Jacobshagen, Volker (ed), Geologie von Griechenland, Beiträge zur regionalen Geologie der Erde, Stuttgart, 1986. in German/English
 Mariolakos, Ilias. Geomythological Sites and Prehistoric geotechnical and hydraulic Works in Arkadia, 12th International Congress of the Geological Society of Greece, Field Trip Guide, Patras May 2010 in Greek
 Morfis, A. (Athens), Zojer, H. (Graz). Karst Hydrogeology of the Central and Eastern Peloponnesus (Greece).  Steirische Beiträge zur Hydrogeologie 37/38. 301 Seiten, Graz 1986.
 Pausanias, Description of Greece, English Translation by W.H.S. Jones + H.A. Ormerod, London, 1918.

External links

 Pausanias, Book 8, English translation, on Argon Pedion
 Mariolakos, Geomythological Sites in Arcadia (incl. Argon Pedion) 
 Conference.arcadians.gr, Pan-Arcadian Congress
 Arcadia.ceid.upatras.gr, University of Patras, Arkadia-Project
 Cs.bham.ac.uk, Arcadia, Greece
 Tripolis.gr
 Tyros.gr

 
1833 establishments in Greece
Prefectures of Greece
Regional units of Peloponnese (region)